Rachel Wilding (born 18 July 1976 in Woking, Surrey, England) is an English judoka, who competed in the women's half-heavyweight category. She picked up a total of thirty-one medals in her career, and represented Great Britain in the 78-kg class at the 2004 Summer Olympics. Throughout most of her sporting career, Wilding trained for the Camberley Judo Club in Camberley under her personal coach and sensei Mark Earle.

Judo career
Wilding was a three times champion of Great Britain, winning the middleweight division at the British Judo Championships in 2000 and the half-heavyweight title in 2002 and 2004.

Wilding qualified for Team GB in the women's half-heavyweight class (78 kg) at the 2004 Summer Olympics in Athens, by securing a place and a victory from the British judo trials in Wolverhampton. She opened her prelim match by throwing Spain's Esther San Miguel into the tatami on a brilliant ippon and an ura nage (rear throw) with only 25 seconds left in the clock, before falling short to Ukraine's Anastasiia Matrosova in the quarterfinals with a more robust tactic. Wilding gave herself a chance for an Olympic medal in the repechage round, but wasted her charm with a tough defeat from South Korea's Lee So-yeon.

At the 2005 European Judo Championships in Rotterdam, Netherlands, Wilding recorded her career best to pick up a silver medal in the 78-kg division, losing out to neighboring France's Céline Lebrun in the final.

References

External links
 
 

1976 births
Living people
English female judoka
Olympic judoka of Great Britain
Judoka at the 2004 Summer Olympics
Sportspeople from Woking